Jefferson Junio Antonio da Silva (born 3 January 1997), simply known as Jefferson, is a Brazilian footballer who plays for Atlético Goianiense as a left back.

Club career
Born in Jaraguá, Goiás, Jefferson joined Goiás' youth setup in 2009, aged 12. Promoted to the first team for the 2016 season, he made his senior debut on 10 April of that year, starting in a 5–3 Campeonato Goiano away win against Trindade.

Jefferson made his Série B debut on 13 May 2016, playing the full 90 minutes in a 1– away defeat of Tupi. Regularly used in his first year, he subsequently became a backup option, contributing with only two league matches in Goiás' promotion campaign.

Jefferson became a first-choice for the 2019 season, and made his Série A debut on 28 April, starting in a 1–0 away win against Fluminense. He scored his first goal in the category on 10 June, netting his team's second in a 3–1 home defeat of Chapecoense. On 19 September, he extended his contract until 2022.

Honours
 Atlético Goianiense
Campeonato Goiano: 2022

References

External links
Goiás EC profile 

1997 births
Living people
Sportspeople from Goiás
Brazilian footballers
Association football defenders
Campeonato Brasileiro Série A players
Campeonato Brasileiro Série B players
Goiás Esporte Clube players
Atlético Clube Goianiense players